Dereje Alemu is an Ethiopian professional footballer, who plays as a goalkeeper for Muger Cement.

International career
In January 2014, coach Sewnet Bishaw, invited him to be a part of the Ethiopia squad for the 2014 African Nations Championship. The team was eliminated in the group stages after losing to Congo, Libya and Ghana.

References

Living people
Ethiopian footballers
Ethiopia A' international footballers
2014 African Nations Championship players
Dashen Beer F.C. players
1990 births
Place of birth missing (living people)
Association football goalkeepers
Ethiopia international footballers
2016 African Nations Championship players